Mamdouh Abbas Ahmed Al Saleh (born in 1973 in Manama) is a Bahraini actor, assistant director, fashion designer, art director, and politician. He was sworn into the Council of Representatives on December 12, 2018, representing the Third District of the Capital Governorate.

Career

Al Saleh founded the Scope Studio & Artistic Production, producing the political play أنا بكره إسرائيل (“I Hate Israel”) in 2006. He told Deutsche Presse-Agentur that he donated proceeds from the production to Hassan Nasrallah, Secretary-General of Lebanon’s Hezbollah. He then produced the television series وحوش وضحايا (“Monsters and Victims”) in 2008, the first of many works since.

Council of Representatives
In the 2018 Bahraini general election, Alsaleh ran to represent the Third District in the Capital Governorate in the Council of Representatives, the nation’s lower house of Parliament. He received 563 votes for 20.26% in the first round on November 24, necessitating a runoff on December 1, in which he defeated his opponent, Mahdi Sharar, with 906 votes for 52.19%.

References

Members of the Council of Representatives (Bahrain)
Bahraini male actors
1973 births
Living people